North Olmsted is a city in Cuyahoga County, Ohio,  United States.  As of the 2020 census, the city population was 32,442. North Olmsted is a west side suburb of Cleveland, Ohio, and is the 8th most populated city within Cuyahoga County.

History
The land that became North Olmsted was originally part of the French colony of Canada (New France), which was ceded in 1763 to Great Britain and renamed Province of Quebec. In the late 18th century the land became part of the Connecticut Western Reserve in the Northwest Territory, then was purchased by the Connecticut Land Company in 1795.

In 1806, the vast tract of land comprising present-day North Olmsted, Olmsted Falls and Olmsted Township was purchased for $30,000 by Aaron Olmsted, a wealthy sea captain.  In 1815, David Johnson Stearns of Vermont was followed by other pioneers from New England who established a settlement in the wilderness.  It was first called Plum Creek Township, an unofficial name, in 1807 and then in 1814 surveyors called it Kingston.  On April 14, 1823 the people organized into a township called Lenox.  In 1909, the city of North Olmsted came into being.  

In 1826, Aaron Olmsted's son, Charles Hyde Olmsted, offered to donate books from his father's personal collection in Connecticut, if the residents of Lenox agreed to change the name of the area to Olmsted to honor his father.  These books became known as the Ox Cart Library.

Geography
North Olmsted is located at  (41.415097, -81.914366).

Demographics

90.6% spoke English, 2.3% Arabic, 1.5% Spanish, and 0.9% German, in their households.

2020 census 
At the 2020 census there were 32,442 people in 13,093 households, including 8,325 families, in the city. The population density was 2,778 inhabitants per square mile (1,072/km²). There were 14,390 housing units at an average density of 1,233.1 per square mile (476.0/km²). The racial makeup of the city was 86.4% White, 3.1% African American, 0.2% Native American, 2.8% Asian, 1.6% from other races, and 6.0% from two or more races. Hispanic or Latino people of any race were 5.0%.

Of the 13,093 households 20.9% had children under the age of 18 living with them, 51.1% were married couples living together, 25.3% had a female householder with no spouse present, 19.1% had a male householder with no spouse present, 4.5% were non-families. 35.0% were one person and 14.5% were one person aged 65 or older. The average family size was 3.04.

The median age was 44.4 years. 19.9% of residents were under the age of 18. The gender makeup of the city was 49.1% male and 51.9% female.

2010 census
At the 2010 census there were 32,718 people in 13,645 households, including 8,893 families, in the city. The racial makeup of the city was 92.6% White, 2.0% African American, 0.1% Native American, 2.7% Asian, 0.9% from other races, and 1.7% from two or more races. Hispanic or Latino people of any race were 3.5%.

Of the 13,645 households 26.5% had children under the age of 18 living with them, 51.6% were married couples living together, 9.6% had a female householder with no husband present, 4.1% had a male householder with no wife present, and 34.8% were non-families. 30.1% of households were one person and 12.3% were one person aged 65 or older. The average household size was 2.37 and the average family size was 2.97.

The median age was 43.5 years. 20.7% of residents were under the age of 18; 7.7% were between the ages of 18 and 24; 23.5% were from 25 to 44; 30.1% were from 45 to 64; and 17.8% were 65 or older. The gender makeup of the city was 48.3% male and 51.7% female.

2000 census
At the 2000 census there were 34,113 people in 13,517 households, including 9,367 families, in the city. The population density was 2,932.9 people per square mile (1,132.5/km). There were 14,059 housing units at an average density of 1,208.7 per square mile (466.7/km).  The racial makeup of the city was 93.97% White, 1.01% African American, 0.13% Native American, 2.74% Asian, 0.01% Pacific Islander, 0.45% from other races, and 1.68% from two or more races. Hispanic or Latino people of any race were 1.69%.

Of the 13,517 households 29.6% had children under the age of 18 living with them, 57.4% were married couples living together, 8.6% had a female householder with no husband present, and 30.7% were non-families. 26.5% of households were one person and 9.9% were one person aged 65 or older. The average household size was 2.50 and the average family size was 3.07.

The age distribution was 23.7% under the age of 18, 7.3% from 18 to 24, 27.6% from 25 to 44, 26.5% from 45 to 64, and 15.0% 65 or older. The median age was 40 years. For every 100 females, there were 93.3 males. For every 100 females age 18 and over, there were 89.7 males.

The median household income was $52,542 and the median family income  was $62,422. Males had a median income of $45,908 versus $30,600 for females. The per capita income for the city was $24,329. About 2.8% of families and 4.1% of the population were below the poverty line, including 4.3% of those under age 18 and 6.5% of those age 65 or over.

Business
Moen Incorporated, a fixture and faucet company, is headquartered in North Olmsted.

CommutAir, a regional airline flying on behalf of United Express, is also headquartered in North Olmsted.

Traveling

Major roads
 Lorain Road.  Lorain Road is part of Ohio Route 10. Lorain Road also contains Ohio Route 252 for a short stretch. It enters the city from North Ridgeville to the west and from Fairview Park to the east.  It then continues through Cleveland, where it is designated "Lorain Avenue" It is probably North Olmsted's busiest street. It runs east–west through the city with many businesses on the road.  West of North Olmsted, Lorain Road connects via connector road with the Ohio Turnpike at Exit 152.  At one time, a section of Lorain Road in North Olmsted was once listed in the Guinness Book of World Records for having the most restaurants within a mile radius.

References

External links

 
 The North Olmsted, Ohio Community Advocate
 

Cities in Ohio
Cities in Cuyahoga County, Ohio
Cleveland metropolitan area